Aethes xanthina is a species of moth of the family Tortricidae. It is found from European Russia to the Near East, Turkmenistan, Kazakhstan, Tajikistan, Uzbekistan, Kyrgyzstan and Iran.

Adults are on wing from May to July.

References

xanthina
Moths described in 1963
Moths of Europe
Moths of Asia